Kundaj (also Romanized as Kūndaj, Kondaj, Kavandaj and Kavandūj) is a village in Kuhpayeh-e Gharbi Rural District, in the Central District of Abyek County, Qazvin Province, Iran. At the 2006 census, its population was 1,801, in 419 families.

References 

Populated places in Abyek County